The African Union High Representative for Infrastructure Development post was created in October 2018 by the African Union Commission Chair Moussa Faki 
The first and current High Representative is Raila Odinga, Leader of the Opposition and former Prime Minister of Kenya (2008-2013), who was appointed on 20 October 2018 by the Chairperson of the African Union Commission. Prior to this appointment, the Directorate of Trade and Industry was headed by Elisabeth Tankeu.

Role
The High Representative is tasked with working to support and strengthen the efforts of the commission's relevant Departments and those of the Planning and Coordinating Agency of the New Partnership for Africa's Developpement (NEPAD), within the framework of the Program for Infrastructure Development in Africa (PIDA), which was endorsed by the Assembly of the Union in January 2012.

The mandate includes mobilizing further political support from Member States and the Regional Economic Communities (RECs) and facilitating greater ownership by all concerned stakeholders on the continent. He will also support the Commission and NEPAD initiatives to encourage increased commitment from development partners.

In the discharge of his mandate, and building on the work and leadership of the PIDA Presidential Infrastructure Champion Initiative (PICI), the High Representative will pay particular attention to the missing links along the transnational highway corridors identified as part of the Trans-African Highways Network, with a view to facilitating their development and modernization. He will also focus on the continental high-speed train, which is one of the flagship projects of the First Ten-Year Implementation Plan of Agenda 2063, in the context of the relevant African Union decisions. He will interact with the current Champions of related African Union initiatives and seek their guidance, to ensure the required synergy and coherence.

Appointments
The High Representative is appointed by the Chairperson of the African Union Commission.

List of African Union High Representative for Infrastructure Development

References

African Union officials